Wuming Mandarin or Wuming Guanhua, known locally as Wuminghua, is a dialect of Southwestern Mandarin spoken in urban Wuming District, specifically in the towns of Chengxiang and Fucheng. It is a variety that has been influenced substantially by Zhuang, which is the majority language of the district.

Classification
Wuming Mandarin is classified as a part of the Gui–Liu subgroup of Southwestern Mandarin. The second edition of the Language Atlas of China further classifies it as part of the Guinan (southern Guangxi) cluster.

Phonology

Initials
There are 18 phonemic initials (including the zero initial):

Rimes
There are seventy (70) rimes.

Tones
There are seven tones, six of which are native:

The other tone,  (35), is non-native, occurs in very few words, and corresponds to the yin level tone in Pinghua.

Notes

References
 
 
 
 
 
 
 

Nanning
Mandarin Chinese